William Henry "Nin" Alexander  (November 4, 1858 – December 22, 1933) was an American major league baseball catcher, center fielder and shortstop.

Biography
Alexander was born in Pana, Illinois. He played his first professional game on June 7, 1884, with the Kansas City Unions. He played professionally for the Kansas City Unions and the St. Louis Browns. He played his last professional game on September 3, 1884.

He died on December 22, 1933.

References

External links

Baseball-Reference.Com
ESPM MLB

1858 births
1933 deaths
Major League Baseball catchers
Kansas City Cowboys (UA) players
St. Louis Browns (AA) players
19th-century baseball players
St. Joseph Reds players
Baseball players from Illinois
People from Pana, Illinois